Pavshozero is a rural locality (a settlement) in Annenskoye Rural Settlement, Vytegorsky District, Vologda Oblast, Russia. The population was 466 as of 2002. There are 7 streets.

Geography 
Pavshozero is located 44 km southeast of Vytegra (the district's administrative centre) by road. Staroye Petrovskoye is the nearest rural locality.

References 

Rural localities in Vytegorsky District